S. A. Devshah  (Telugu: స. ఆ. దేవ్శః) was an Indian politician and was a Member of the Legislative Assembly during the 4th and 5th assemblies of Andhra Pradesh.

Political career

S. A. Devshah was Member of the Legislative Assembly from Boath constituency  for two straight terms. He was a member of the Indian National Congress political party. In 1967, he won by a margin of 5,623 votes whereas in the 1972 elections he won by 12,939 votes.

Posts Held

See also

Boath (Assembly constituency)
Andhra Pradesh Legislative Assembly
Government of India
Indian National Congress
Politics of India

Notes

  Boath Assembly constituency was a part of the Andhra Pradesh Legislative Assembly till 2014. In 2014, the state of Andhra Pradesh was bifurcated into Andhra Pradesh and Telangana. Boath Assembly constituency is now a part of Telangana Legislative Assembly.

References 

Andhra Pradesh MLAs 1967–1972
Andhra Pradesh MLAs 1972–1978
Indian National Congress politicians from Andhra Pradesh
Date of birth unknown
Possibly living people
Telugu politicians